Flanders Expo is a multi-purpose arena and convention center located in Ghent, Flanders, Belgium. Flanders Expo was founded in 1986 and officially opened in May 1987 with the third edition of Flanders Technology International. It serves as a venue to host a large variety of events including concerts, exhibitions, trade fairs and sports. The first CEO was Marc Mortier from 1986 till 2002.

Building

Flanders Expo is the biggest event hall in the Flanders region and the second biggest in Belgium. It is the 40th largest exhibition complex in the world.

The complex consists of eight interconnecting halls, each of which can be used separately, a conference centre and three restaurants. Hall 8's capacity is more than 13,000 people. In the vicinity of the halls, there are 4,000 parking spaces.

Halls
The central-located flagship hall, Hall 1, is the largest hall and offers an area of 19.152 m2. To the left of this central hall are Halls 2, 4 and 6, on the right are 3, 5 and 7. These identical halls all offer 4.032 m2 of space. Hall 8 was later added, this is a large multi-purpose square hall with an area of 10.735 m2 and a height of 13 meters. This height and a special sound wall helped to improve the acoustics in the hall thus making it suitable for larger productions such as sporting and musical events. On the first floor there is a large room of 850 m2, this is called the Forum.

History of events

Concerts
Until 2002, a lot of concerts took place in Flanders Expo. Famous artists who have performed in Flanders Expo include Tina Turner (12 times), Celine Dion, Janet Jackson, Simple Minds, Phil Collins, Charles Aznavour, Bryan Adams, Prince, Cher, Elton John, Britney Spears, Backstreet Boys, Paul McCartney, Joe Cocker, Whitney Houston, Barry White, U2, Nick Kamen, Eros Ramazzotti, Bon Jovi, Scorpions, Metallica, AC/DC, Steps  etc.

Every year in autumn it is host to the I Love Techno music festival. It is the biggest indoor techno festival in Europe, with 60,000 visitors in one evening.

Sport
It hosted the 1988 FIBA Champions Cup Final four. The 2015 Davis Cup World Group final between Belgium and Great Britain was held at the Expo.

See also
List of tennis stadiums by capacity

Notes

External links

Indoor arenas in Belgium
Convention centres in Belgium
Sports venues in East Flanders
Sport in Ghent
Buildings and structures in Ghent
Buildings and structures completed in 1987
Tourist attractions in Ghent